Prince Mircea of Romania (3 January 19132 November 1916) was the third son and last child of King Ferdinand of Romania and his wife, Marie of Edinburgh and a great-grandson of Queen Victoria through his mother. He died aged three in 1916.

Birth
Prince Eitel Friedrich of Prussia arrived by train to Bucharest to represent his father. He was met there by King Carol I, Crown Prince Ferdinand and Prince Carol. His godparents were the German Emperor Wilhelm II, King Carol I, Queen Elisabeth and Empress Maria Feodorovna of Russia. His mother, the Crown Princess was absent due to a possible attack of phlebitis. During his short life, he was known to get along very well with his sister, Princess Ileana of Romania. His governess was Mary Green.

Death
Prince Mircea died at Buftea on 2 November 1916 of typhoid fever, during a time of war, when enemy troops were approaching Bucharest and many battles were taking place close to the city. The royal family had to quickly bury him on the grounds of Cotroceni Palace, before they went into retreat to Iași, the old capital of Moldavia, the unoccupied part north-eastern Romania. His death certificate was partially burnt. His original tombstone read:

In 1920, Mircea's eldest brother, the future Carol II, named his child with Zizi Lambrino Mircea Grigore, in memory of Prince Mircea who had died just four years earlier. In 1941, Mircea was reburied, at the request of Princess Ileana, from Cotroceni to the little chapel of Bran Castle, close to the burial place of Marie's heart. 

In January 2018, it was announced that the remains of King Carol II will be moved to the new Archdiocesan and Royal Cathedral, along with those of Queen Mother Helen. In addition, the remains of Prince Mircea will also be moved to the new cathedral.

Etymology
Mircea is an exclusively Romanian-used name that is derived from the Old Slavic mir meaning "peace" or "world". 

Prince Mircea was named after Mircea I of Wallachia, a medieval Romanian Prince of Wallachia who organised a vigorous resistance to the Turks in the 14th century, and whose troops fought side by side with the Serbians on the fatal field of Kossovo.

Ancestry

Notes

 The most common used date is January 3, but the date on his first tomb had the Old Style date, 22 December 1912. 
 It was believed at the time that his biological father was Prince Barbu Știrbey and now most historians agree that this is true. 
 Mary Green was also the governess of his sister, Princess Ileana and his brother, Prince Nicholas.

References

1913 births
1916 deaths
Deaths from typhoid fever
Princes of Hohenzollern-Sigmaringen
Members of the Romanian Orthodox Church
Romanian princes
Infectious disease deaths in Romania
Royalty who died as children